Wilson Dias da Fonseca (17 November 1912 – 24 March 2002) was a Brazilian maestro, composer, conductor and writer. He was born in Santarém, Pará, and died in Belém, aged 89.

Principal Works 

 "Hymn of Santarém" ("Hino de Santarém").
 "One Poem of Love" ("Um Poema de Amor").
 "Land Beloved" ("Terra Querida").
 "Legend of Bouto" ("Lenda do Boto").
 "500 Years America" - symphonic poem (1992).
 "Blue Tapajós" ("Tapajós Azul") - waltz.
 "Amazonian Symphony" ("Sinfonia Amazônica").
 "Vitória-Régia, O Amor Cabano" - opera.

External links
  Santarem 
 Dicionário MPB 

1912 births
2002 deaths
Brazilian composers